The Standing Orders of the Dewan Rakyat are used by the Dewan Rakyat, the lower chamber of the Parliament of Malaysia as its primary procedural authority. The Standing Orders are made by the Dewan Rakyat in pursuance of Article 162 of the Federal Constitution.

External links
 Standing Orders of the Dewan Rakyat - Thirteenth Publication, April 2013

Parliament of Malaysia